The Second Coming is a documentary video collection released by the band Kiss in 1998. The video is focused on the reunion of the original Kiss lineup and subsequent Alive/Worldwide Tour, which took place in 1996 and 1997.

Bonus features
Included as exclusive content on the DVD edition.

Reception
The Second Coming was certified Platinum in the US.

References

External links
 IMDb entry

Kiss (band) video albums
2000 video albums
Live video albums
2000 live albums